Bula or  BULA may refer to:

Places 
Bula, Camarines Sur, a municipality in the Philippines
Bula (Guinea-Bissau), sector in Guinea-Bissau
Bula, Indonesia, a village on Seram Island
Bula, Texas, US
Bula, West Virginia, US
Bula (river) in Tatarstan and Chuvashia, Russia
Clipped form of Ashtabula, Ohio, US

Other uses 
Bula, a Fijian word that translates as either "hello" or "life"
Bulă, a stock character in Romanian comedy
Bula (horse), a racehorse that won the Champion Hurdle in 1971 and 1972
Basic Ultra-Light Aeroplane, a Canadian aircraft category
Beach Ultimate Lovers Association, a body promoting the sport of Beach Ultimate
I. L. Bula (1921–?), Fijian cricketer
Bula (band), a Brazilian alternative rock band
Bundeslager (BuLa) or "federal camp" hosted by Swiss or German scout associations, particularly Swiss Guide and Scout Movement#BuLa Jamborees

See also
Bula Bula
Bulla (disambiguation)